The amber rock dtella (Gehyra electrum) is a species of gecko in the genus Gehyra. It is endemic to northeastern Queensland in Australia.

References

Gehyra
Reptiles described in 2019
Geckos of Australia